Alfred Henry Clarke (October 25, 1860 – January 30, 1942) was a Canadian politician.

Born in Manilla, Canada West, Clarke was educated at the Public School of Manilla and the Oakwood High School. In addition to studying law at the University of Toronto, he was also a Bencher of the Law Society of Upper Canada, a County Crown Attorney, and a Clerk of the Peace and Local Master in Chancery in Essex. Clarke was first elected to the House of Commons of Canada for the electoral district of Essex South in the general elections of 1904. Standing as a Liberal, he was re-elected in 1908 and 1911.

He became a judge of the Supreme Court of Alberta Appellate Division in 1921 until 1942.

References
 
 The Canadian Parliament; biographical sketches and photo-engravures of the senators and members of the House of Commons of Canada. Being the tenth Parliament, elected November 3, 1904

1860 births
1942 deaths
Liberal Party of Canada MPs
Members of the House of Commons of Canada from Ontario
University of Toronto alumni
Lawyers in Ontario
Judges in Alberta